KSD Shanbhag Vidyalaya is a school in Satara, India.  The average size of each class is around 45 (pre-primary and primary: three divisions for each class, Secondary: two divisions for each class). All classrooms are "smart" (equipped with digital teaching aids). This school has an ISO certified rating.

The school was established in 1990 in the memory of Shri. Shamrao Dasapayya Shanbhag by his son Ramesh Shanbhag.

Academics
The syllabus was approved by the Maharashtra State Board. Classes are available till 10th std.

Sports
The school offers the following sports and activities:
 Basketball
 Football
 Hockey
 Taekwondo
 Karate
 Yoga
 Cricket
 Athletics
 Indian classical dance (Bharatanatyam)
 Hindustani Music (singing, harmonium and tabla) 
 Western dance.

Co-curricular and extra-curricular activities
Over 30 competitions and celebrations are conducted every year such as handwriting competition, quiz competition, elocution competition, mask making, and kite flying. Almost all festivals from Ashadhi Ekadashi to Gudi Padwa are celebrated. 

The school has a stage where the co-curricular and extra-curricular activities take place.
Social activities include Fun Fair (amount generated is donated to a NGO), Tree Plantation, Cleanliness Drive.

Students are given Scout & Guide and MCC training.

Ojas eternal light of knowledge, the school magazine, publishes various reports, photographs and articles by the staff and students.

Sports

The inter-house tournaments of all sports are conducted in December each year.

Gathering

The school celebrates the annual social gathering for three days in January. Past students meet is arranged during the same time.

External links

http://www.ksdshanbhagvidyalaya.com

Schools in Maharashtra
Education in Satara district
Educational institutions established in 1990
1990 establishments in Maharashtra